The 30th Annual Gotham Independent Film Awards, presented by the Independent Filmmaker Project, were held on January 11, 2021. The nominations were announced on November 12, 2020. Actors Chadwick Boseman and Viola Davis, director Steve McQueen, writer Ryan Murphy, and the cast of The Trial of the Chicago 7 received tribute awards.

The awards honored the best independent filmmaking released between January 2020 and February 2021. Originally scheduled to take place on November 20, 2020, the ceremony was pushed back by two months due to the coronavirus pandemic.

Ceremony information
Originally scheduled to take place in November of 2020, the ceremony was pushed back due to the coronavirus pandemic. The eligibility period for releases was extended to include films released between January 1 and February 28, 2021. Films that were scheduled to release theatrically, but had to be released via VOD, are also eligible for the awards. The submission deadline for films was on October 1, 2020. To be eligible for the film awards, the films must be over 70 minutes, have a budget of under $35 million and must have been written, directed, and produced by a United States citizen (except for films qualifying for the Best International Feature category).

Winners and nominees

Film

Television

Special awards

Ensemble Tribute
 The Trial of the Chicago 7 – Yahya Abdul-Mateen II, Sacha Baron Cohen, Caitlin FitzGerald, Joseph Gordon-Levitt, Kelvin Harrison Jr., Michael Keaton, Alice Kremelberg, Frank Langella, Eddie Redmayne, Mark Rylance, Ben Shenkman and Jeremy Strong

Made in NY Award
 Jeffrey Wright

Gotham Tributes
 Chadwick Boseman (posthumously)
 Viola Davis
 Steve McQueen
 Ryan Murphy

References

External links
 

2020 film awards
2020